Sayed Durahman is a member of the Wolesi Jirga for Lagham Province, Afghanistan.
He is an ethnic Pashtun.
He has a degree in Islamic Affairs.
Prior to being elected to the national legislature he was a madrassa teacher.

References

Sayed Durahman
Living people
People from Laghman Province
Pashtun people
Year of birth missing (living people)